Sitai  is a village and gram panchayat in the Sitai CD block in the Dinhata subdivision of the Cooch Behar district  in the state of West Bengal, India.

Geography

Location

Area overview
The map alongside shows the western part of the district. In Dinhata subdivision 5.98% of the population lives in the urban areas and 94.02% lives in the urban areas. In Mekhliganj subdivision 9.91% of the population lives in the urban areas and 90.09% lives in the rural areas. In Mathabhanga subdivision 3.67% of the population, the lowest in the district, lives in the urban areas and 96.35% lives in the rural areas. The entire district forms the flat alluvial flood plains of mighty rivers.

Note: The map alongside presents some of the notable locations in the subdivisions. All places marked in the map are linked in the larger full screen map.

Sagardighi bridge
The Sagardighi Bridge across the Mansai River has been constructed, linking Sitai and Dinhata.

Civic administration

Police station
Sitai police station has jurisdiction over Sitai CD block. It covers an area of 156.82 km2.

CD block HQ
The headquarters of the Sitai CD block are located at Sitai village.

Demographics
As per the 2011 Census of India, Sitai had a total population of 4,949.  There were 2,538 (51%) males and 2,411 (49%) females. There were 657 persons in the age range of 0 to 6 years. The total number of literate people in Sitai was 2,468 (57.50% of the population over 6 years).

Healthcare
Sitai Rural Hospital, with 30 beds at Sitaihati, is the major government medical facility in the Sitai CD block.

References

External links

Villages in Cooch Behar district